Andrés Leonardo Achipiz (born July 5, 1994) is a Colombian serial killer, hired assassin, and psychopath. He is known by the alias The Fish, referring to his childhood where he sold fish in his neighborhood. According to his own confession, he claimed to have killed between 30 and 35 people in Bogotá, more specifically in Kennedy and Bosa, where he was hired to selectively kill in exchange for large sums of money, ranging from $600,000 to $4,000,000 worth of pesos. He was convicted of only 12 cases.

Due to being a multiple murderer, he was sentenced to prison and is currently in the La Picota Prison, in southeastern Bogotá.

According to specialists in criminology and psychiatry, Achipiz is a "murderer by vocation" and could not be resocialized. Psychiatrists have diagnosed him as a psychopath.

Biography 
Andrés Leonardo Achipiz was born in 1994 and grew up in the Britalia neighborhood, located in the Bogotá's southwest, after his parents moved from Huila to the capitol in search of a better life. He is the second of 6 children, with his parents enrolling him in El Gran Britalia school, where Achipiz studied until the 6th grade of high school, because he decided to help his father as a street vendor, selling fruits and fish. According to his own confession, he was a victim of physical and psychological abuse by his father, who required of him a minimum amount of money for the sales' performance. Overwhelmed by the situation, he began to steal from various houses north of Bogotá with other youths, where he obtained large sums of money, but also stole valuables such as watches, wallets, bicycles, etc. As time passed and at the age of 16, he was contacted by a well-known Bogotá criminal, who worked with hired killers in the drug micro-trafficking trade, known by the alias of Camilo. As an active member of a criminal gang, Achipiz worked in the small-scale illicit drug trade in Kennedy and Bosa. According to the authorities, Achipiz assassinated his victims with firearms or sharp objects. In the year of 2009, he was arrested and sent to a youth detention center by the police after committing two murders. However, he later escaped from prison after a riot.

Even after these events and with the capture of Camilo, he decided to continue with the criminal activities. Achipiz was widely known in the aforementioned towns of Bogotá, which is why he was contacted by other gangs to work as a sicario. In exchange for this, Achipiz would charge between one and six million pesos.

He was captured on June 25, 2013 on a bus, after being intercepted by specialized agents.

Pathology 
According to the Association of Psychiatrists of Latin America, Achipiz was diagnosed with a "psychopathic personality disorder, that is, he is prone to circumvent the norms and to attack others." It was also pointed out that he lacked feelings of guilt and that, in general, the abuse suffered from childhood and adolescence, as well as the lack of affection from the family, contributed to the factor.

Belisario Valbuena, criminal profiler and official of the Manuela Beltrán University in Bogotá, also assured that in this type of person "the medical and psychological treatments are insufficient". For this reason, the use of correctional facilities and prisons were indispensable as control measures. Achipiz was also compared with American serial killer Richard Kuklinski, who in his childhood, also experienced physical and psychological abuse by his parents. Finally, he was described as a "murderer by vocation".

See also 
 List of serial killers in Colombia
 Richard Kuklinski

References 

1994 births
Colombian serial killers
Contract killers
Living people
Male serial killers
People convicted of murder by Colombia
People from Bogotá
People with antisocial personality disorder
Prisoners and detainees of Colombia